Prionapteryx nebulifera, the clouded veneer moth, is a moth in the family Crambidae. It was described by Stephens in 1834. It is found in North America, where it has been recorded from Florida, Georgia, Maryland, Michigan, New Hampshire, Ontario, South Carolina and Wisconsin.

Adults have been recorded on wing from May to August.

The larvae feed on Ericaceae species, including Leiophyllum buxifolium and probably Gaylussacia species. Pupation takes place in the larval retreat.

Etymology
The species name is derived from Latin nebula (meaning mist, fog, clouds) and fera (meaning bearing).

References

Ancylolomiini
Moths described in 1834